Pteranthus is a monotypic genus of flowering plants belonging to the family Caryophyllaceae. The only species is Pteranthus dichotomus.

Its native range is Canary Islands, Mediterranean to Pakistan and Arabian Peninsula.

References

Caryophyllaceae
Monotypic Caryophyllaceae genera